Bocheonism (Korean: 보천교 Bocheongyo or Pochonkyo, "religion of the vault of heaven/firmament") was one among more than 100 new religious movements of Korea of the family of religions called Jeungsanism, rooted in Korean shamanism and recognizing Gang Il-sun (Kang Jeungsan) as the incarnation of Sangje, the Supreme God. It was founded by Cha Gyeong-seok (1880-1936) on Ibam Mountain in Daeheung-ri, Ibam-myeon, Jeongeup, Jeollabuk-do, in the year 1911. Today this site is part of Naejangsan National Park.
Cha Gyeong-seok was originally a Donghak (Cheondoist) priest, who converted to Jeungsanism after meeting Gang Il-Sun. After Gang's death, Goh Pan-Lye (Subu, literally “Head Lady,” 1880–1935, although in Kang's circle there was more than one "Subu"), a female disciple of Kang Jeungsan, around September 1911 gathered around her a number of Kang's followers. Cha Gyeong-seok was Goh's male cousin and became the leader of Goh's branch. Dissatisfied with this situation, Goh separated from Cha in 1919 and established her own new religion.  Cha continued under the name Bocheon-gyo, which was adopted in 1921, at a great ritual held in Hamyang County, Gyeongsangnam-do.
Eventually, Bocheonism became the largest Korean new religious movement and possibly the largest religion in Korea, with some six million followers, including leading activists in the Korean independence movements. Bocheonism, however, declined rapidly after Cha's death in 1936, and fragmented into several competing group, as did Goh's organization. The largest among these branches is Jeung San Do.
Cha prophesied that the unification of the world would take place beginning in Korea. Branches of Bocheonism are also credited with encouraging local culture in the Jeongeup region, including the pungmulgut performance tradition.

See also
 Cheondoism
 Jeungsanism
 Jeung San Do
 Daesun Jinrihoe
 Okhwangsangje

Sources
 Kim Jaeyoung. Bocheongyo and Religions of Korea. Shin Achulpansa, 2010. Korean language only. 
 Lee Chi-ran. Chief Director, Haedong Younghan Academy. The Emergence of National Religions in Korea.

References

External links
 증산도 공식 홈페이지

New religious movements 
North Jeolla Province
1911 establishments in Korea
Jeung San Do